Kiddie may refer to:

 Child
 The Kiddie, a Japanese visual kei rock band
 "Kiddie", a song by White Ash from Quit or Quiet
 Script kiddie or skiddie

See also
 Kidde, a fire protection equipment manufacturer